Margarita  Mamun (born 1 November 1995) is a retired Russian individual rhythmic gymnast of Bangladeshi-Russian descent. She is the 2016 Olympic All-around champion, two-time (2015, 2014) World All-around silver medalist, the 2015 European Games All-around silver medalist, the 2016 European Championships All-around silver medalist, three-time (2015, 2014, 2013) Grand Prix Final All-around champion and a three-time (2011–2013) Russian National All-around champion.

She is the current record holder under the 20-point judging system with the highest All-around total of 77.150 points; which she scored at the 2016 Baku World Cup. At the 2016 Olympic Games, Mamun won the All-around gold with a total score of 76.483 points.

Early and personal life

Mamun was born in Moscow, Russia to a Bengali father Abdullah Al Mamun, who was born in Rajshahi, Bangladesh, and had a master's degree in marine engineering, and a Russian mother Anna, a former rhythmic gymnast.

Mamun holds both Russian and Bangladeshi citizenship, and has one younger brother named Filipp Al Mamun. On 26 August 2016, Mamun's father, Abdullah, died from cancer at the age of 52, two days after she returned to Russia from Brazil, six days after she won Olympic gold.

Shortly after the 2016 Olympic Games, Mamun became engaged to Olympic swimmer Alexandr Sukhorukov. The couple had been dating for three years when Sukhorukov proposed to Mamun at the Russian Olympic Ball. The couple married on 8 September 2017. On 17 July 2019, Mamun announced that she was pregnant through a post on her Instagram. On 3 October 2019, she gave birth to their son, Lev Alexandrovich Sukhorukov.

Career

Junior
As a junior, Mamun competed in a number of international tournaments. She competed at the 2005 Miss Valentine Cup in Tartu, Estonia. She was coached by former rhythmic world champion Amina Zaripova. She briefly competed for Bangladesh at age 12 but returned to representing Russia as a senior.

Senior

2011-2012
Mamun competed at the 2011 International Tournament of Calais, where she won gold in the All-around and in hoop, clubs and ribbon final. She made her senior international breakthrough at the 2011 World Cup in Montreal, Quebec, Canada, where she won the bronze medal in all-around and gold in ball finals ahead of Liubov Charkashyna. In 2012, she competed at the 2012 Moscow Grand Prix, where she finished 9th in all-around.

In the 2012 FIG World Cup series event in Kyiv (Deriugina Cup), Mamun won the bronze medal in hoop, ball and ribbon final. At the Sofia event of the 2012 World Cup series she won the all-around gold. She finished 4th in all-around at the Tashkent leg. She and teammate Daria Dmitrieva then competed at the senior 2012 AEON Cup in Japan and won the team gold medal.

2013 season

In 2013, Mamun started her season competing at the Moscow Grand Prix winning the gold medal in all-around ahead of silver medalist Sylvia Miteva and teammate Daria Svatkovskaya. She also won gold in hoop, ball, clubs and bronze in ribbon final.

At the Thiais Grand Prix, Mamun won all the gold medals: All-around, hoop, ball, clubs and ribbon. She won the gold medal in All-around and in all apparatus finals at the second World Cup series event held in Lisbon, Portugal.

Mamun competed at the 2013 World Cup event in Sofia, where she won the bronze in all-around behind Bulgarian Sylvia Miteva. She won gold in ball and silver in ribbon final (tied with Ganna Rizatdinova). At the Corbeil-Essonnes World Cup, she won another bronze medal in All-around, but won three gold medals in event finals in hoop, ball and ribbon; she won silver in clubs.

Mamun competed at her first Senior Europeans at the 2013 European Championships in Vienna, Austria and together with her teammates (Yana Kudryavtseva and Daria Svatkovskaya ) won Russia the team gold medal. At the event finals, she won gold in ribbon and three silver medals (ball, hoop and clubs). She then competed at the 2013 Summer Universiade, where she won gold in All-around ahead of teammate Alexandra Merkulova. At the event finals, she won gold in hoop, ribbon, clubs and placed 8th in ball.

At the 2013 World Cup series in St.Petersburg, Russia, Mamun won the all-around gold medal and in the event finals, she won gold medal in (hoop, clubs, ribbon) and silver in ball. Mamun then competed at the 2013 World Championships in Kyiv, Ukraine, where she won gold medal in ball with a score of 18.516 points and shared the gold medal in clubs with teammate Yana Kudryavtseva; she also took bronze medal in hoop and placed 5th in ribbon final. Mamun finished 6th at the 2013 World Championships All-around final.

She then competed at the 2013 Grand Prix Brno and won the all-around gold ahead of Svatkovskaya, she won another gold in ribbon, ball, silver in hoop and bronze in clubs. Mamun won the all-around at the 2013 Grand Prix Final in Berlin and gold medal in hoop and ball, silver in clubs behind Daria Svatkovskaya and 5th in ribbon. On 25–27 October, Mamun competed at the world club championship, the AEON Cup, in Tokyo, Japan representing team Gazprom (together with teammates Yana Kudryavtseva and junior Yulia Bravikova) and won the team gold. She then won bronze in the All-around finals.

2014 season

In 2014, Mamun began her competitive season at the 2014 Moscow Grand Prix where she won the all-around gold medal ahead of teammate Maria Titova. She then won three gold medals in the hoop, ball and clubs event finals and silver in ribbon. She won the all-around silver medal at the 2014 Thiais Grand Prix behind Kudryavsteva, a silver in hoop and gold in clubs.

Mamun then competed at the 2014 World Cup series event in Stuttgart, where she won all-around silver. In event finals she won gold in ball, hoop (both tied with Kudryavtseva) and ribbon, and won bronze in ball (tied with Rizatdinova ). Mamun won the all-around gold at the 2014 Holon Grand Prix ahead of Kudryavtseva; in the event finals: she won gold medals in ball and hoop, silver in ribbon. At the World Cup leg in Pesaro, Mamun won the all-around silver medal, and also won silver medals in ball and hoop finals.

On 23–27 April, Mamun competed as the defending national champion at the 2014 Russian Championships, where she won the All-around silver medal, behind Kudryavtseva. Mamun then competed at the 2014 Desio Italia Cup and won the all-around gold medal. On 9–11 May, Mamun won the all-around gold at the 2014 World Cup event in Corbeil-Essonnes. She qualified to 4 event finals and won gold in clubs, silver in ribbon, 6th in ball and 5th in hoop. On 22–24 May, Mamun won her second World Cup all-around title of the season at Tashkent scoring an overall total of 74.750 points, ahead of teammates Yana Kudryavtseva (silver) and Aleksandra Soldatova (bronze). In the event finals, she won gold in clubs, ribbon, a silver in ball and finished 5th in hoop. In her next event, Mamun won the all-around bronze medal at the Minsk leg of the World Cup series, behind Melitina Staniouta. She qualified to 3 event finals winning the silver medal in (ribbon, ball and clubs).

On 10–15 June, Mamun competed at the 2014 European Championships and finished 5th in all-around after a mistake ridden hoop routine and 3 drops in her clubs routine. Mamun returned to competition in August and took the silver medal in all-around at the 2014 Sofia World Cup, she qualified to 2 event finals and won silver in ball and clubs. On 5–7 September, competing at the 2014 World Cup series in Kazan, Mamun took the all-around silver medal behind Kudryavtseva with a total of 73.250 points. She qualified to 3 event finals and won gold in hoop, silver in ball and placed 4th in ribbon.

On 22–28 September, Mamun (along with teammates Yana Kudryavtseva and Aleksandra Soldatova) represented Russia at the 2014 World Championships where they won Team gold with a total of 147.914 points. She qualified to all event finals and won 2 gold medals in ribbon and ball (tied with Kudryavtseva), 2 silver in hoop, clubs. In the All-around, Mamun won the all-around silver medal with a total of 74.149 points, behind compatriot Kudryavtseva. On 17–19 October, Mamun traveled in Tokyo for the 2014 Aeon Cup, representing team Gazprom (together with teammates Yana Kudryavtseva and junior Veronika Polyakova) won the team gold. She won the All-around gold in the finals beating teammate Kudryavtseva. In 1–3 November, Mamun won the all-around gold at the 2014 Grand Prix Brno. On 14–16 November, Mamun won the 2014 Grand Prix Final in Innsbruck, Austria, sweeping the all-around and event final gold medals.

2015 season

In 2015, Mamun started her season at the 2015 Moscow Grand Prix where she won gold in the all-around, ribbon and hoop finals. She also won bronze in the ball final.

On 13–15 March, Mamun won the gold medal at the Trophy de Barcelona in the all-around, (ball, ribbon, clubs) and silver in hoop. On 27–29 March, Mamun competed at the 2015 Lisbon World Cup, a series of drops in her clubs cost Mamun the gold medal, but she took 2nd place in the all-around total behind rising teammate Aleksandra Soldatova. She qualified to 3 event finals, taking gold in hoop, ball and ribbon. On 3–5 April, Mamun competed at the 2015 Bucharest World Cup winning the all-around silver behind Kudryavtseva. She qualified 2 event finals and won silver in hoop and ball. Her next event, at the 2015 Pesaro World Cup, Mamun won the all-around gold beating Yana Kudryavtseva, she qualified to 3 event finals winning gold in hoop, silver in clubs and bronze in ball.

On 1–3 May, Mamun competed at the 2015 European Championships where she together with Yana Kudryavtseva and Aleksandra Soldatova won team gold for Russia. She qualified to 3 event finals, winning gold in hoop, silver in ball and 5th in ribbon. On 15–16 May, Mamun won the all-around silver at the 2015 Holon Grand Prix, she qualified 3 event finals, winning silver in hoop and bronze (clubs, ribbon). Mamun swept her first gold for the season at the 2015 Tashkent World Cup, where she won the all-around title with a total of 75.500 points and all 4 event finals.

Mamun won the all-around gold at the 2015 Berlin Grand Prix with a total of 75.350 points, she won 3 golds in apparatus finals (hoop, ball, clubs) and bronze in ribbon. On 12–28 June, Mamun participated at the inaugural 2015 European Games in Baku, where she won the silver medal in the all-around with a total of 75.650 points (a personal best). She won gold in hoop finals, the only event she scored higher than Yana Kudryavtseva in qualifications (a quota of 1 per country in apparatus finals in the European Games for gymnastics). In August, Mamun competed at the 2015 Budapest World Cup, winning silver in all-around behind Kudryavtseva. Mamun qualified to all 4 apparatus finals, where she won gold in clubs, and 3 silvers (hoop, ball, ribbon).

At the 2015 Sofia World Cup, Mamun won the all-around silver medal, she qualified to 3 apparatus finals, taking silver in hoop, ribbon and finished 8th in ball after a drop from a risk and with her retrieving the apparatus, rolling out of the carpet. At the 2015 World Cup stage in Kazan, Mamun won the all-around gold medal with a total of 75.550 points beating teammate Yana Kudryavtseva, Mamun's momentum was built further after a drop from Kudryavtseva's clubs and not completing a risk element scored only 17.800. Mamun qualified to all apparatus, showing her best results for the finals in Hoop (19.100), Ball (19.050), Clubs (19.100) and Ribbon (19.100).

On 9–13 September, at the 2015 World Championships in Stuttgart, Mamun (together with teammates Yana Kudryavtseva and Aleksandra Soldatova) represented Russia, where they won the team gold. She qualified to 3 apparatus finals, taking gold in hoop and two silver medals (ribbon, ball). In the All-around finals; Mamun was ranked 1st from 2nd rotation leading into the last rotation; until she dropped her ribbon in a risk element, she eventually won the silver medal behind compatriot Yana Kudryavtseva. Mamun was awarded with the Longines Prize for Elegance at the Championships.

On 2–4 October, Mamun together with teammates Aleksandra Soldatova and junior Alina Ermolova represented Team Gazprom at the 2015 Aeon Cup in Tokyo Japan, Mamun the individual all-around title and with Team Russia winning the gold medal in the overall standings. Mamun then competed at the 2015 Grand Prix Final in Brno, where she won the all-around gold medal with a total of 76.050, a personal best score. She qualified to all apparatus finals, taking gold in hoop and ball; however, she withdrew from the last two apparatus finals because she experienced discomfort and fever.

2016 season

In 2016, Mamun started her season at the 2016 Moscow Grand Prix finishing 4th in the all-around, she qualified to 2 apparatus finals taking gold in clubs and ball (tied with teammate Aleksandra Soldatova). On 12–13 March, Mamun competed at the MTM Tournament in Ljubljana, Slovenia where she won the all-around gold with a total of 75.950 points, in the apparatus finals; she won gold in hoop, clubs, ribbon and bronze in ball.

At the 30th Thiais Grand Prix event in Paris, Mamun won the all-around gold ahead of teammate Aleksandra Soldatova, she qualified 3 event finals, taking gold in hoop, clubs and silver in ball. On 1–3 April, Mamun competed at the 2016 Pesaro World Cup where she won the all-around silver with a total of 75.900 points (a new Personal Best) behind teammate Yana Kudryavtseva, she qualified to 3 apparatus finals taking gold in hoop, clubs, placed 5th in ball and 4th in ribbon. Mamun won the all-around silver behind Aleksandra Soldatova at the 2016 Russian Championships held in Sochi. Then in the event finals, she took the four gold medals.

On 6–8 May, Mamun competed at the 2016 Brno Grand Prix where she won the all-around gold breaking her Personal Best score with a total of 77.100 points; she also swept the gold medals in all 4 apparatus finals (hoop, ball, clubs, ribbon). She won another gold medal in the all-around at the 2016 Minsk World Cup with a total of 75.700 points, she also won all 4 of the apparatus finals.

On 3–5 June, Mamun won the all-around gold at the 2016 Guadalajara World Cup with a total score of 76.550 points, in the apparatus finals: she also won gold in hoop, clubs, ribbon and placed 4th in ball. On 17–19 June, Mamun competed at the 2016 European Championships, she dropped her hoop once however she scored well in her remaining apparatus in ball(19.166), ribbon(19.133) and Clubs(19.333) - a European record under the 20 point CoP judging system; her overall results were enough to win her the all-around silver medal ahead of Ukraine's Ganna Rizatdinova.

On 8–10 July, Mamun won the all-around gold medal at the 2016 Kazan World Cup with a total of 77.050 points, beating teammate Kudryavsteva by more than 2 points, Mamun also qualified to all 4 apparatus finals taking gold in clubs, ribbon and silver in hoop, ball. On 22–24 July, culminating the World Cup of the season in 2016 Baku World Cup, Mamun won another all-around gold which she narrowly defeated Kudryavsteva with a total of 77.150 points - which is a New World Record and updating Mamun's personal Record. In the apparatus finals: Mamun won gold medals in ball, clubs, and ribbon (clubs and ribbon tied with Kudryavsteva), and silver in hoop. On 9–11 September, Mamun together with teammates Aleksandra Soldatova and junior Maria Sergeeva represented team Gazprom at the annual 2016 Aeon Cup in Tokyo, where they won the team gold and with Mamun winning the senior individual all-around title.

2016 Rio de Janeiro Olympics

On 19 August, Mamun competed at the preliminary session where she earned the top score in the qualifications. On 20 August, at the rhythmic gymnastics individual all-around final, Mamun was trailing Kudryavsteva after the second rotation; but in the third rotation in clubs; at the last seconds of Kudryavtseva's routine, Kudryavsteva failed to catch one of her clubs and had to scramble to get her hand on it before the music ended. Mamun kept her composure and rallied in her clubs and with her ribbon routine sealed her the Olympic gold medal scoring a total of 76.483 points edging out World Champion Yana Kudryavtseva who won the silver medal. Mamun was the only gymnast in the final to have scores over 19 points (out of 20) on all four apparatus.

Retirement 
On 4 November 2017, Irina Viner officially announced to the Russian press that Mamun has completed her competitive career in rhythmic gymnastics.

Post-Olympics career 
Mamun was the protagonist of Marta Prus' 2017 documentary film Over the Limit.

Records
 Current World Record Holder under the 20-point judging system with the highest All-around total of 77.150 points; which she scored at the 2016 Baku World Cup.

Routine music information

Detailed Olympic results

Competitive highlights
(Team competitions in seniors are held only at the World Championships, Europeans and other Continental Games.)

References

External links

 
 Margarita Mamun at r-gymnastics.com 
 
 
 

1995 births
Living people
Russian rhythmic gymnasts
Gymnasts from Moscow
Olympic gold medalists for Russia
Olympic gymnasts of Russia
Olympic medalists in gymnastics
Bangladeshi rhythmic gymnasts
Russian people of Bangladeshi descent
Gymnasts at the 2015 European Games
European Games medalists in gymnastics
European Games gold medalists for Russia
European Games silver medalists for Russia
Medalists at the Rhythmic Gymnastics World Championships
Gymnasts at the 2016 Summer Olympics
Universiade medalists in gymnastics
Universiade gold medalists for Russia
Medalists at the 2016 Summer Olympics
Medalists at the 2013 Summer Universiade
Medalists at the Rhythmic Gymnastics European Championships